Shoulder Arms (German: Das Gewehr über) is a 1939 German drama film directed by Jürgen von Alten and starring F.W. Schröder-Schrom, Rolf Moebius and Rudi Godden. It was based on a novel by Wolfgang Marken. The film's German title refers to a word of command in the German drill book.

A German emigrant to Australia becomes concerned that his son has been too strongly influenced by the democratic, permissive attitudes of the country and decides to send him back to Germany for military service. While his son at first resents and resists his new lifestyle, he is eventually converted to the cause of Nazi Germany.

The film was made as a piece of propaganda to support the policies of the Nazi regime. It was one of a growing number of films of the late 1930s that were hostile towards life in the British Empire on the eve of the Second World War.

Cast
 F.W. Schröder-Schrom Hartwig sen.  
 Rolf Möbius as Paul Hartwig 
 Rudi Godden as Gestütaufseher Charlie Kühne  
 Carsta Löck as Lotte  
 Hilde Schneider as Hühnerfarmbesitzerin Trude Schmidt  
 Wolfgang Staudte as Unteroffizier Schmidt  
 Georg H. Schnell as Großkaufmann Thomson  
 Charlott Daudert as Evelyne Thomson  
 Leopold von Ledebur as General A. D. Henning  
 Wilhelm Althaus as Hauptmann Wehnert  
 Ernst Bader as Leutnant Stolle  
 Walter Bechmann as Sekretär Schmitz 
 Horst Birr as Schütze Jupp Derksen 
 Adolf Fischer as Unteroffizier Schmidt  
 Walter Gross as Reporter des 'Blankenheimer Tageblatt' 
 Hans Jöckel as Schütze Hermann Lutz  
 Hans Reinhard Knitsch as Gefreiter Hellermann 
 Franz Kossak as Oberfeldwebel Grosse  
 Viktor Carter 
 Bernhard Caspar 
 Gerdi Gerdt
 Käthe Jöken-König
 Erwin Laurenz
 Trude Lehmann
 Benno Mueller    
 Hellmuth Passarge 
 Klaus Pohl 
 Martin Rickelt 
 Bert Schmidt-Maris
 Hans Schneider 
 Waldemar Tenscher 
 Georg Völkel
 Herbert Asmis
 Heinz Berghaus

References

Bibliography 
 Richards, Jeffrey. Visions of Yesterday. Routledge & Kegan Paul, 1973.

External links 
 

1939 films
Films of Nazi Germany
German comedy-drama films
1939 comedy-drama films
1930s German-language films
Films directed by Jürgen von Alten
Films set in Australia
Films set in Germany
Films based on German novels
German black-and-white films
1930s German films